The 2016 Santaizi ATP Challenger was a professional tennis tournament played on indoor carpet courts. It was the third edition of the tournament which was part of the 2016 ATP Challenger Tour. It took place in Taipei, Taiwan between 25 April and 1 May.

Singles main-draw entrants

Seeds

 1 Rankings are as of April 18, 2016

Other entrants
The following players received wildcards into the singles main draw:
  Yi Chu-huan
  Hung Jui-chen
  Yu Cheng-yu
  Wu Tung-lin

The following players received entry from the qualifying draw:
  Marinko Matosevic
  Dayne Kelly 
  Shuichi Sekiguchi
  Yuya Kibi

Champions

Singles

 Daniel Evans def.  Konstantin Kravchuk, 3–6, 6–4, 6–4

Doubles

 Hsieh Cheng-peng /  Yang Tsung-hua def.  Frederik Nielsen /  David O'Hare, 7–6(8–6), 6–4

References
 Combo Main Draw

External links
 Official website

Santaizi ATP Challenger
Santaizi ATP Challenger
2016 in Taiwanese tennis